The 1917 Southwest Texas State football team was an American football team that represented Southwest Texas State Normal School—now known as Texas State University–as an independent during the 1917 college football season. Led by second-year head coach G. B. Marsh, the team finished the season with a record of 5–3. The team's captain was McGree, who played tackle.

Schedule

References

Southwest Texas State
Texas State Bobcats football seasons
Southwest Texas State Bobcats football